Billy Rice (12 September 1938 in Belfast, Northern Ireland – 26 June 2008) was a football player who played for Australia in their 1966 FIFA World Cup qualification campaign.

References

1938 births
2008 deaths
Australian soccer players
Northern Ireland emigrants to Australia
Association footballers from Belfast
Association football defenders
Australia international soccer players